Belloa is a genus of South American flowering plants in the sunflower family.

Species
The following species are recognised in the genus Belloa:
 Belloa chilensis J.Rémy
 Belloa eriophora (J.Rémy) M.O.Dillon
 Belloa erythractis (Wedd.) Cabrera
 Belloa nivea (Phil.) M.O.Dillon
 Belloa wurdackiana V.M.Badillo

References

External links
 Belloa. Preliminary Checklist of the Compositae of Bolivia. Royal Botanic Gardens, Kew.

Gnaphalieae
Asteraceae genera
Flora of South America